Líder Paz Colodro (born December 2, 1974) is a retired Bolivian football striker who played his entire career in the Liga de Fútbol Profesional Boliviano.

Club career
His former clubs are Guabirá, The Strongest, Oriente Petrolero, Bolívar and Real Potosí.

International career
He also played for the Bolivia national team between 1999 and 2005, scoring 3 goals in 21 games.

References

External links
 
 

1974 births
Living people
Sportspeople from Santa Cruz de la Sierra
Association football forwards
Bolivian footballers
Bolivia international footballers
2001 Copa América players
Guabirá players
The Strongest players
Oriente Petrolero players
Club Bolívar players
Club Real Potosí players